The  is a railway line, consisting of three geographically separated sections, operated by the East Japan Railway Company (JR East) in Japan. It was originally one continuous line connecting  and  via . Since the opening and later extension of the Hokuriku Shinkansen, sections running in parallel have either been abandoned or transferred to third-sector railway companies.

The name of the line refers to the old names for Nagano and Niigata prefectures, Shinano, and Echigo.

The abandoned section through the Usui Pass was famous for its steep 66.7‰ (6.67%) gradient.

Sections

From 14 March 2015, the line consists of the following three sections.

   –  (29.7 km): in Gunma Prefecture
   –  (9.3 km): in Nagano Prefecture
   –  (136.3 km): in Niigata Prefecture

There are three small freight branches; from Echigo-Ishiyama Station to Niigata Freight Terminal, from Kami-Nuttari Junction to Nuttari Station, and from Kami-Nuttari Junction to Higashi-Niigata-kō Station.

Services

Takasaki–Yokokawa
Local: 1 or 2 trains per hour
Excursion train: SL Gunma Yokokawa and SL YOGISHA Yokokawa

Shinonoi–Nagano 
All trains run through on the Shinonoi Line or the Shinano Railway Line.

Naoetsu–Niigata

Limited express, Rapid
, the following services are operated.

Local
Naoetsu–Nagaoka: every 60-120 minutes 
Nagaoka–Niitsu: every 60 minutes (every 20 minutes during peaks)
Niitsu–Niigata: every 20 minutes (every 5-10 minutes during peaks)

Excursion train (Joyful Train)
Koshino Shu*Kura

Stations

Takasaki–Yokokawa

Yokokawa–Shinonoi 

Shinonoi–Nagano

Nagano–Naoetsu 
The section between Nagano and Naoetsu was transferred to the ownership of the third-sector railway operators Shinano Railway and Echigo Tokimeki Railway from 14 March 2015 with the opening of the Hokuriku Shinkansen extension north of Nagano.

Naoetsu–Niigata
A: Limited Express Shirayuki
B: Rapid Ohayo-Shinetsu
C: Rapid Rakuraku-Train-Shinetsu
D: Rapid
Trains stop at stations marked "O", skip at stations marked "|".

Rolling Stock

Present

Takasaki–Yokokawa
 211 series 4/6-car DC EMUs

Shinonoi–Nagano
 115 series 2/3-car DC EMUs (Shinano Railway)
 211 series 3-car DC EMUs
 E127-100 series 2-car DC EMUs
 383 series 6-car DC EMUs (Shinano)

Naoetsu–Niigata
 115 series 3-car DC EMUs (rapid only)
 E129 series 2/4 car DC EMUs (since December 2014)
 ET127 series 2-car DC EMUs (Naoetsu–Nagaoka, late night/early morning only)
 E653-1100 series 4-car DC/AC EMUs (Shirayuki, Ohayo-Shinetsu, Rakuraku-Train-Shinetsu)

Former

Takasaki–Yokokawa
 115 series (until March 2018)
 107 series (until September 2017)

Naoetsu–Niigata
 485 series (Until March 2017) - Hokuetsu, Kubikino, Ohayo-Shinetsu, Rakuraku-Train-Shinetsu, Moonlight Echigo, Minori, Hakuchō, etc.
 489 series - Noto etc.
 583 series (Until January 2013) - Kitaguni
 181 series, 183 series - Toki etc.
 165 series
 70 series

History

The Japanese Government Railways opened the Takasaki to Yokokawa section in 1885, the Naoetsu to Sekiyama section the following year, and the Sekiyama - Nagano - Karuizawa section in 1888. In order to surmount the 552 metre altitude difference between Yokokawa and Karuizawa (which are 10 km apart), it then constructed an Abt rack section through the Usui Pass, which opened in 1893, and was double-tracked for 1 km from Karuizawa to the top of the rack section. A horse-drawn tramway operated between Yokokawa and Karuizawa until the rack section opened.
 
The Hokuetsu Railway opened the Naoetsu to Nagaoka section in 1897, extending the line to Niigata in 1904. That company was nationalised in 1907. In 1909, the Imperial Japanese Railway authorities invited bids for the electrification of the route. A German company was selected to provide the engines and General Electric supplied the turbines at the power station. In 1912, the rack section was electrified using third rail at 600 V DC, this being the first use of this method in Japan. The electrification allowed for the use of faster and longer trains which reduced journey times and also pollution from the steam engines. A link to archival footage of the rack section operation is available here

Double-tracking
The Karuizawa to Nagano section was double-tracked between 1917 and 1920, with the Nagaoka to Miyauchi section double-tracked in 1931, and the Niitsu - Kamo section in 1944. Double-tracking of the remainder of the Niigata to Naoetsu line was undertaken in sections between 1958 and 1973.

Double-tracking of the remainder of the Takasaki to Kaminagano line was undertaken in sections between 1963 and 1973, commencing with the replacement of the rack mechanism with an adhesion only electrified (1,500 V DC catenary) operation on the 1 in 15 (6.7%) grade. The rack equipment was initially kept as a contingency, and removed two months after the adhesion-only operation commenced and had proved its reliability.

The Kurohime to Myoko-Kogen section was double-tracked in conjunction with a realignment in 1980. The Mure to Kurohime section was also realigned and prepared for double-tracking (including new double-track size tunnels), but the second track was not laid.

Electrification
The Miyauchi to Nagaoka section was electrified in 1947 at 1,500 V DC in conjunction with the electrification of the Joetsu Line, with the Nagaoka to Niigata section electrified in 1962, the same year the Takasaki to Yokokawa section was commissioned to facilitate the extension to Nagano the following year via the new adhesion line through the Usui Pass mentioned above. The Nagano to Naoetsu section was electrified in 1966, and extended to Miyauchi in 1969.

Separation into sections
In 1997, following the opening of the Nagano Shinkansen, the Yokokawa to Karuizawa section was closed, and the Karuizawa to Shinonoi section transferred to the third-sector Shinano Railway.

  Shinano Railway Kita-Shinano Line (37.3 km,  to )
  Echigo Tokimeki Railway Myōkō Haneuma Line (37.7 km,  Myōkō-Kōgen to )

Former connecting lines

(Note - for the connections at stations between Karuizawa and Shinonoi, see Shinano Railway Line)
 Nagano Station: The Zenkoji Hakuba Railway Co. opened a 7 km line to Susohana Guchi in 1936. A proposal for the line to be extended to Hakuba on the Oito Line did not eventuate, and the line closed in 1944.
 Kuroi Station: The Kubiki Railway Co. opened a 15 km  gauge line to Uragawara between 1914 and 1916, with the line closing in 1971.
Raikoji Station: The Nagaoka Railway Co. opened a 39 km line to Teradomari (on the Echigo Line) between 1915 and 1921. This company introduced Japan's first diesel railcar in 1928, and in 1951 electrified 31 km of the line at 750 V DC in 70 days, completing the balance the following year. Significant typhoon damage occurred in 1966, and in 1972, passenger services ceased between Raikoji and Nishinagaoka, with the entire line becoming freight-only three years later. The line closed in 1995.

The 13 km  gauge Uonuma Railway to Nishiojiya was opened in 1911, and nationalised in 1922. It was converted to  gauge in 1954, freight services ceased in 1960, and the line closed in 1984.

Nagaoka Station: The Tochio Railway opened a 27 km  gauge line to Tochio and Yūkyūzan between 1915 and 1924. The line was electrified at 600 V DC in 1948, with this being raised to 750 V DC in 1956. CTC signalling was commissioned in 1961, freight services ceased in 1967, and the line closed between 1973 and 1975.
 Higashi Sanjo Station: The Echigo Railway Co. opened the 8 km line to Echigo Nagasawa in 1927, and was nationalised two months later. Freight services ceased in 1960, and the line closed in 1985.
 Kamo Station: The Kanbara Railway Co. operated a line to Gosen on the Ban'etsu West Line from 1923 until 2002.

References

External links
 Stations of the Shin'etsu Main Line (Gumma) (JR East) 
 Stations of the Shin'etsu Main Line (Nagano/Niigata) (JR East) 

 
Lines of East Japan Railway Company
Rail transport in Gunma Prefecture
Railway lines in Nagano Prefecture
Rail transport in Niigata Prefecture
1067 mm gauge railways in Japan